Jaime Ros (born 5 November 1952) is a Spanish former alpine skier who competed in the 1976 Winter Olympics.

References

1952 births
Living people
Spanish male alpine skiers
Olympic alpine skiers of Spain
Alpine skiers at the 1976 Winter Olympics
Place of birth missing (living people)
20th-century Spanish people